Kyle & Company or Kyle & Co was a steel shipbuilding company in Stockton, California. To support the World War II demand for ships Kyle & Company built: Coastal tankers and Type B ship deck barges. Kyle & Company was opened as a manufacturer of steel products and build ships for the war. After World War II, the shipyard closed in 1950 and was purchased by Pittsburgh-Des Moines Steel Co. Kyle & Company also made steel products in Fresno and Sacramento. The shipyard was located on the Stockton Channel at 348 North Harrison Street, now a parking lot near Banner Stadium and Stockton Arena.  The Kyle & Company shipyard was on the deepwater port on the Stockton Ship Channel of the Pacific Ocean and an inland port located more than seventy nautical miles from the ocean, on the Stockton Channel and San Joaquin River-Stockton Deepwater Shipping Channel (before it joins the Sacramento River to empty into Suisun Bay).

Coastal tanker
Kyle and Company Coastal tankers: had a displacement of 484 tons, length of 162 feet, beam of 27 feet, a draft of 13 feet, top speed of 9 kts, crew of 23, including gun crew of 6. The tanker had two single 20mm AA guns and fuel cargo capacity of 280,000 gal.. It was powered by one 6-cyl diesel engine, with a single screw and had 400 shp.

Deck barge
Kyle and Company built deck barges that had a length of 110 feet, a beam of 35 feet, a draft of 6 feet, light displacement of 170 tons, full displacement of 500 tons, and deadweight of 330 tons.

Ships

See also
California during World War II
Maritime history of California
Moore Equipment Company in Stockton 
Hickinbotham Brothers Shipbuilders  in Stockton
Wooden boats of World War 2
Cryer & Sons

References

American Theater of World War II
1940s in California
American boat builders
Defunct shipbuilding companies of the United States
Shipbuilding companies
Companies based in Stockton, California
Shipbuilding companies of California